Emilio Azofra Iglesias (born 6 August 1958) is a Spanish taekwondo practitioner. He competed in the men's finweight at the 1988 Summer Olympics.

Notes

References

External links
 

1958 births
Living people
Sportspeople from Madrid
Spanish male taekwondo practitioners
Olympic taekwondo practitioners of Spain
Taekwondo practitioners at the 1988 Summer Olympics
World Taekwondo Championships medalists
20th-century Spanish people
21st-century Spanish people